Mikita is a Belarusian given name, cognate of Ukrainian Mykyta and Russian Nikita, all originally borrowed from Greek Nicetas.

People with the given name
 Mikita Brottman (born 1966), British scholar, psychoanalyst, author and cultural critic
 Mikita Bukatkin (born 1988), Belarusian footballer
 Mikita Shuhunkow (born 1992), Belarusian footballer
 Mikita Tsirkun (born 1997), Belarusian sailor
 Mikita Tsmyh (born 1997), Belarusian swimmer

People with the surname
 Andy Mikita, Canadian television director and producer
 Patryk Mikita (born 1993), Polish footballer
 Stan Mikita (born 1940), Slovak-Canadian ice hockey player

Places
Mikita, Rõuge Parish, village in Estonia

See also
 
 Mykyta
 Nikita (disambiguation)

References

Belarusian masculine given names